Charles Gingell (29 May 1897 – 21 January 1965) was a South African cricketer. He played in sixteen first-class matches for Eastern Province from 1920/21 to 1926/27.

See also
 List of Eastern Province representative cricketers

References

External links
 

1897 births
1965 deaths
South African cricketers
Eastern Province cricketers
People from Uitenhage
Cricketers from the Eastern Cape